Hanebado! is written and illustrated by Kōsuke Hamada. The series follows Ayano Hanesaki recovering from a disappointing badminton match in middle school. While her mother, Uchika Hanesaki left Ayano to their grandparents. Which one day she will play badminton again and have a chance to see Uchika again. The manga was published in Kodansha's seinen manga magazine good! Afternoon from June 7, 2013 to October 7, 2019, and released in sixteen tankōbon volumes.


Volume list
Note: Each individual chapter of the series are called Rally. For example, the first chapter is "1st Rally".

References

Hanebado!